Hyacinthe Collin de Vermont (19 January 1693, Versailles – 16 February 1761, Paris) was a French painter.

Collin de Vermont was a pupil of Jouvenet and of Rigaud.

Works 
 Bacchus changes the Maenads' works into vine foliage, Musée de Versailles
 Cyrus, as an adolescent, having the son of Artembares whipped, Musée Magnin de Dijon
 Jupiter and Mercury at the house of Philemon and Baucis, Musée de Versailles
 Autumn (beehive), Musée des Beaux-Arts de Rouen
 Summer (haystack and plough), Musée de Rouen
 The Shepherd Apulas transformed into an olive tree, Musée de Versailles
 Belshazzar's Feast, Musée Magnin de Dijon
 The Mystical Marriage of Saint Catherine, Musée des beaux-arts de Lyon
 The Rejuvenication of Iolaus by Hebe, Musée de Versailles
 The Marriage Feast of Alexander and Roxana, Paris; Musée du Louvre
 Roger arriving in Alcine Island, 1740, Museum of Grenoble

Notes

External links 
 
 Hyacinthe Collin de Vermont on Base Joconde 

1693 births
1761 deaths
18th-century French painters
French male painters
18th-century French male artists